Bill Aho is an American businessman who is a partner with The SagePoint Group, a management consulting firm.

He received his B.A. from the University of Minnesota Duluth and an MBA from the Brigham Young University Marriott School of Management in 1983.

Aho began his career in brand management at Procter & Gamble. He later spent nine years with PepsiCo. He also served as Senior Vice President of Strategic Planning for Darden Restaurants and was instrumental in turning around the Red Lobster business. He has been featured in many publications, including The Wall Street Journal and Forbes, and appeared on many TV and radio broadcasts, including MSNBC, Entertainment Tonight, PBS, ABC News, NPR, etc. In 2006 and 2007 he  was named to the V100 as one of Utah’s top entrepreneurs.

From 2001 to 2007, he served as CEO of the movie-filtering company ClearPlay. In 2021, he became CEO of VidAngel, another movie filtering company.

References 

Brigham Young University alumni
University of Minnesota Duluth alumni
American businesspeople
1957 births
Living people